Biathlon at the 2018 Winter Olympics was held at the Alpensia Biathlon Centre, Daegwallyeong-myeon, Pyeongchang-gun, Gangwon-do, South Korea. There were eleven events contested: men and women competed in each of sprint, pursuit, individual, mass start, and relay; there was also a mixed relay event. The eleven events were scheduled to take place between 9 and 23 February 2018.

Qualification

A total of 230 quota spots were available to athletes to compete at the games (115 men and 115 women). Countries were assigned quotas using a combination of the Nation Cup scores of their top three athletes in the individual, sprint, and relay competitions, during the 2016–17 Biathlon World Cup season. The final twelve quota spots were available the following season.

Competition schedule
The following was the competition schedule for all eleven events.

Notes
 Women's 15 km individual was postponed due to high winds from 14 February to 15 February.

All times are (UTC+9).

Medal summary

Medal table

Men's events

Women's events

Mixed event

Participating nations
A total of 219 athletes from 28 nations (including the IOC's designation of Olympic Athletes from Russia) were scheduled to participate (the numbers of athletes are shown in parentheses).

References

External links
 Official Results Book – Biathlon

 
2018
Biathlon
Winter Olympics
Biathlon competitions in South Korea